Ron Gardin (born September 25, 1944) is a former NFL professional American Football defensive back and kick returner. He played in Super Bowl V for the Baltimore Colts. He played college football at the University of Arizona.

After his professional football career ended, he worked as a Recreational Coordinator for the Marty Birdman Recreation Center in the Tucson Parks and Recreation Department. He is a past president of the NFL's Retired Players Association.

Sources

1944 births
Living people
Players of American football from New Haven, Connecticut
American football defensive backs
American football return specialists
Arizona Wildcats football players
Baltimore Colts players
New England Patriots players